The Bajrakli Mosque (named in Turkish as Bayraklı, bayrak is Turkish for "flag" and Bayraklı means "with flag") is a mosque in Belgrade, the capital of Serbia. It is located in Gospodar Jevremova Street in the neighbourhood of Dorćol. It was built around 1575, and is the only mosque in the city out of the 273 that had existed during the time of the Ottoman Empire's rule of Serbia.

During the occupation of Serbia by the Austrians (between 1717 and 1739), it was converted into a Roman Catholic church; but after the Ottomans retook Belgrade, it was returned to its original function.

It was damaged after being set on fire on the eighteenth of March 2004, during that year's unrest in Kosovo, in violent protest to the burning of Serbian churches in Kosovo, but it was later repaired.

History 

Out  of  former  more  than  200 mosques  and  many  small  Islamic places  of  worship  the  so  called  mesdzid,  the  Bajrakli  Mosque  in 11,  Gospodar  Jevremova  Street  is the  only  remaining and  active  example  of  Islamic  religious  architecture  in  Belgrade. It is situated on a slope towards the Danube River, near the junction with Kralja Petra Street. Once it dominated in the atmosphere of  mostly  ground  floor  houses  in  the  busy  commercial  and  craft town district of Belgrade, the so-called Zerek.

Descriptions of Belgrade of the 17th century were preserved by Ottoman travel writer Evliya Çelebi in which he vividly described the  appearance  of  the  town  in  the  period  of  Turkish  rule,  with various  buildings  of  Islamic  architecture. It  is  assumed  that  today's  Bajrakli  Mosque was  built  on  the  place  of  an  older  mesdzid,  probably in the second half of the 17th century, as the endowment of the Turkish ruler Sultan Suleiman II (1687—1691). It was originally named after former renewers, Čohadži-Hajji Alija's and  later Hussein Ćehaja's mosque, while the current name was given in the late 18th  or in the early 19th century. In it, as in the main mosque, there was the muwaqqit, the man  who  calculated  the  exact  time  of  AH  according  to  the  Islamic  calendar  (which  began  in  622, i.e.  in  the  year  of  Hijra,  the  year  during  which  the emigration of the Prophet Muhammad from Mecca  to  Medina) occurred  to  determine  sacred  days, regulated clock mechanism and put the flag on the minaret,  to  signal  the  simultaneous  beginning  of the prayer to other Islamic places of worship in the town of Belgrade. Between 1717 and 1739, during the Austrian rule, it served as a cathedral Catholic church,  but  its  original  function  was  renewed  in 1741  when  the  Ottomans  returned  to  Belgrade. The  mosque  was  renewed  in  the  19th  century  by the rulers of the Obrenovic dynasty, Prince Mihailo and King Aleksandar Obrenović.

In  1868,  The  Minister  of  Education  and  Church Affairs  was  ordered  by  Prince  Mihailo  Obrenovic to choose one of the existing mosques and enable it  for  the  performance  of  Muslim  religious  rites, when  besides  the  mosque  was  repaired  even  the courtyard  building  next  to  it. The  Minister  of  Education and Church Affairs sent to the State Council of the Principality of Serbia a document dated May 10, 1868, with the following content: "In order for Mohammedans, who are on their business in Belgrade, not to be without religious consolation, His Excellency ordered the one of the local mosques to be repaired for their place of  worship.

By the Decree of Prince Mihailo Obrenović from May 1868, The Minister of Education and Church Affairs was authorized to "give to khoja  240,  and  a  muezzin  120  talirs  a  year",  and  the  servants of the mosque had even income from real estate - waqf property. The first imam and the muezzin at the Bajrakli Mosque were appointed in 1868.

Between the two world wars, the mosque was restored even by the  Municipality  of  Belgrade, when  in 1935  it  was  protected  for the first time by the Regulation on the Protection of Antiquities in 
Belgrade. The restoration was performed several times and after the Second World War  by  the  National  Committee  of  the  City  of Belgrade and by the Cultural Heritage Preservation and Scientific Research  Institute  and,  from  the  mid  sixties  of  the 20th century even by the Cultural Heritage Preservation Institute of Belgrade. After  the  recent  damage  in  2004  conservation  works  on  rehabilitation and restoration of stone facades with the restoration of window openings were carried out.

Architecture 

The  architecture  of  the  mosque  belongs  to  the  type  of  one-storey cubic building with a  dome  and minaret. With  massive  walls  and small  openings,  it  was  built  of  stone,  and  some  segments  were  carried out in brick and stone. The building has the square plan, while the octagonal  dome  is  supported  by  oriental  domed  arches  and  niches -trompes,  with  modest  decoration  of consoles. The  number  of  windows on the facades is uneven, while the one is located on each side of the tambour of the dome. Dome supporting elements and all the openings  on  the  building  end  in  characteristic  ogee  oriental  arches. Opposite the entrance, in the interior of the mosque, there is the most sacred space - the mihrab, a shallow niche with elaborate vault decoration, set in the direction of the holy city of Mecca to the southeast, while the raised wooden pulpit, mimbar, is set to the right of the mihrab, in the south-west  corner. Above  the  entrance,  there  is  a  wooden  gallery (mahfil) from which one can come to the serefa, terrace on the minaret.

Interior decoration of the mosque is very modest. The walls are without  plaster  with  shallow  moldings,  rare  stylized  floral  and geometrical motifs and calligraphic inscriptions of verses from the 
Allah's magnificent properties and names written in Arabic letters on a specially decorated carved panels levhas. At the entrance to the mosque there was an  arched  arcade  porch  with  three  small  domes. There is a fountain for prayer washing in the yard, as  well  as  uncompleated  religious  school  (madrassa)  with  the  library. The  Bajrakli  Mosque  is the  main  Islamic  cultural  center  in  Belgrade. Today  is  a  bit  hidden  in  the  environment  of  higher housing units in Gospodar Jevremova Street.

Gallery

See also
Timeline of Islamic history
Islamic architecture
Islamic art

References

External links 
 At Belgrade's official site
 Bajrakli Mosque + picture
 Abdulah Talundžić, Bajrakli džamija u Beogradu
 Бајракли џамија на званичном сајту Београда.
 Локација на ВикиКарти
 Зашто нисмо одбранили Бајракли џамију ("Политика", 18. мај 2010)
 Ожиљци насиља и дање на Бајракли џамији ("Политика", 29. март 2011)
 Завод за заштиту споменика културе града Београда, каталози 2011, Бајракли џамија, аутор Хајна Туцић
 Завод за заштиту споменика културе града Београда, каталог културних добара
 Ријасет исламске заједнице Србије, 10.10.2013
 Cultural Heritage Without Borders, András Riedlmayer, Harvard University, 15 April 2004. page 12, (10.10.2013)

Bibliography 

 E. Çelebi, Travel Writing: Fragments on Yugoslav countries I, Sarajevo, 1979. (17th century, Istanbul, 1896)
 F. Kanitz, Serbia - Country and Population, Vol.1, Belgrade 1989. (Leipzig, 1909)
 A. I. Hadzic,   Bajrakli   Mosque   in   Belgrade,   GGB   No.4, Belgrade 1957.
 R. Samardzic, New Century: Era of Turkish Rule 1521–1804, in History of Belgrade 1, Belgrade, 1974.
 D. Djuric Zamolo, Beograd as Oriental Town under the Turks 1521–1867, Belgrade, 1977.
 A.  Talundžić,  Bajrakli  Mosque  in  Belgrade,  Most  -  Journal of  Education,  Science  and  Culture  No.183,  94-new  series, Mostar, 2005.
 S. Bogunović, Architectural Encyclopedia of Belgrade of the 19th and 20th Century, Belgrade, 2005.
 Bajrakli  Mosque,  Dossier  of  Cultural  Monuments  of  the Documentation  Centre  of  the  Cultural  Heritage  Preservation Institute of Belgrade.

Tourist attractions in Belgrade
Mosques in Serbia
Buildings and structures in Belgrade
Cultural Monuments of Great Importance (Serbia)
Religious buildings and structures in Belgrade
Ottoman architecture in Serbia
Stari Grad, Belgrade